Jason Scorse is an associate professor of Environmental Policy Studies at the Middlebury Institute of International Studies. Scorse is also the director of the Center for the Blue Economy.

Biography
Scorse received his Ph.D in Agricultural and Natural Resource Economics from University of California Berkeley in 2005 with a specialization in environmental economics and policy, international development, and behavioral economics.

Scorse was featured in Fortune magazine and CNN Money to explain surfonomics which measures the market value of a good surf break.

References

External links
 Middlebury Institute of International Studies Faculty

University of California, Berkeley alumni
Living people
Year of birth missing (living people)